Meandarra is a rural town and locality in the Western Downs Region, Queensland, Australia. In the  the locality of Meandarra had a population of 262 people.

Geography 

The Glenmorgan railway line enters the locality from the east and terminates at the Meandarra railway station immediately north of the town.

History
First surveyed in 1912 by surveyor John Daveney Steele, the town derived its name from a pastoral run first used by pastoralist Archibald Meston on 16 October 1867.

Cooroorah Provisional School opened in 1913 and closed on 1919. After a temporary closure in 1915, it closed permanently 1919. Its location was "via Meandarra".

Meandarra State School opened on 27 September 1915.

Kinkabilla Provisional School opened on 1921 and closed circa 1934. Its location was "via Meandarra".

Meandarra Post Office opened on 1 January 1928 (a receiving office was open from 1910 until 1918).

On 21 June 1953 St Margaret Mary Catholic Church was officially opened and dedicated by the Vicar Capitular of Roman Catholic Diocese of Toowoomba Michael Morrissey McKenna. It was the first church in Meandarra.

St Augustine's Anglican Church opened in 1955.

The Meandarra Public Library building opened in 1993.

Meandarra Assembly of God Church was established in 1995. It later renamed itself as the Country Hope Church.

At the 2006 census, Meandarra and the surrounding area had a population of 341.

The Meandarra ANZAC Memorial Museum was opened in 2009.

The Glenmorgan railway line was closed beyond Meandarra to Block Trains on 26 June 2013, making Meandarra the terminus. the line beyond Meandarra is "booked out of use" as of 2022

In the  the locality of Meandarra had a population of 262 people.

Education 
Meandarra State School is a government primary (Prep-6) school for boys and girls at Sara Street. In 2016, the school had an enrolment of 37 students with 4 teachers (3 full-time equivalent) and 5 non-teaching staff (3 full-time equivalent). In 2018, the school had an enrolment of 41 students with 5 teachers (3 full-time equivalent) and 6 non-teaching staff (3 full-time equivalent).

There is no secondary school in Meandarra. The nearest secondary school is Tara State College in Tara to the east, but it is a considerable distance for a daily commute and other options would be distance education or boarding school.

Amenities 
The Western Downs Regional Council operates the Meandarra Library on Sara Street.

St Augustine's Anglican Church is on the north-west corner of Sara Street and Maude Street.

St Margaret Mary Catholic Church is at 16 Walton Street. It is part of the St Mary of the Angels' Parish of Tara.

The Country Hope Church (also known as the Meandarra Assembly of God Church) is on the north-west corner of Sara Street and Gibson Street. 

The Meandarra/Glenmorgan Lutheran congregation holds their services in the Glenmorgan Community Church.

The Royal Hotel operates on Sara Street.

Attractions 
Meandarra ANZAC Memorial Museum is in Sara Street. It contains a large collection of ANZAC memorabilia including a Canberra bomber and a German U-boat engine.

References

External links 

 

Towns in Queensland
Western Downs Region
Localities in Queensland